The English industrial metal band Godflesh have released 181 songs; 129 are original tracks, 47 are remixes done by the band of their own songs and 5 are covers. The group, initially composed of B. C. Green and Paul Neville, formed in 1982 as Fall of Because but did not release any complete music until 1988 after Justin Broadrick joined, became frontman and renamed the project Godflesh. Though their debut, a self-titled EP, was released on a small, independent label named Swordfish, it was successful and drew the attention of Earache Records. After being picked up by Earache, Godflesh released the albums Streetcleaner (1989) and Pure (1992) and were then acquired by Columbia Records.

Following the disappointing sales of their third album, 1994's Selfless, and the ban of the music video for "Crush My Soul", Columbia dropped Godflesh, and the band returned to Earache. They then released Songs of Love and Hate in 1996, Love and Hate in Dub (an experimental remix album) in 1997 and Us and Them in 1999. The band again parted from Earache and released Hymns in 2001 before breaking up in 2002. Broadrick and Green reunited in 2009 with plans to create music together again, officially reformed Godflesh in 2010 and released A World Lit Only by Fire in 2014 and Post Self in 2017.

Musically, Godflesh's songs are characterised by machine percussion played in repetitive loops, driving bass and distorted guitar. Though two of their albums (Songs of Love and Hate and Hymns) featured human drummers, Broadrick saw these inclusions as a dilution of what the band set out to achieve. As pioneers of industrial metal, Godflesh's earliest songs are exceptionally slow and mechanical, employing a blend of heavy metal and industrial music. The bass and drums are unusually loud (as on the track "Avalanche Master Song" from the Godflesh EP), and the guitars and vocals play a secondary, more background role (as on "Pulp" and "Life Is Easy" from Streetcleaner). On their second album, Pure, Godflesh began to experiment with sprawling ambient pieces (as on "Pure II"), hip hop and breakbeats (as on the introductory song "Spite") and extreme degrees of heavy repetition (as on "Predominance"). Selfless saw the band taking a more straightforward metal approach, with a heavy emphasis on riffs (as on "Bigot" and "Toll"). This era of Godflesh (1988 to 1994) would retrospectively be seen as Broadrick's favorite.

Throughout their career, Godflesh have only released a handful of singles and music videos. None of their songs have charted individually despite Columbia's efforts to augment Godflesh's popularity and raise it in line with that of Nine Inch Nails. Within the band's catalogue are many remixes that were made by Broadrick. Aside from studio cover songs, Godflesh have performed "Requiem" by Killing Joke live.

Songs

Demos, live recordings and remixes for other artists

Demos

Live recordings

Remixes for other artists
Justin Broadrick has created a number of remixes over his career, and the distinction between a Broadrick remix and a Godflesh remix is often unclear; there is little effective difference since Broadrick is Godflesh's main creative force and sole remixer. The ones listed below are explicitly labeled with the Godflesh title or are inextricably tied to Godflesh (such as the two remixes for Pantera). For a more complete list of Broadrick's remixes, see his discography.

References

Notes

Sources

External links
 Godflesh songs at AllMusic
 Godflesh on Bandcamp through Avalanche Recordings (2003–present)
 Godflesh on Bandcamp through Earache Records (1988–2001)

Godflesh
Godflesh